Alcosser ( or Alcocer de Planes ) is a municipality in the Valencian comarca of Comtat, in the province of Alicante, Spain.

It is situated on the shore of the Serpis river, south of the Serra de Benicadell, in the central part of the Foia de Cocentaina. It is bordered on the north by Gaianes, on the east by Planes, on the west by Muro d'Alcoi, and on the south by Benimarfull.

References

External links
 Statistics for Alcocer de Planes. Unidad de Documentación de Presidencia de la Diputación de Alicante 

Municipalities in the Province of Alicante
Comtat